Brocchinia acuminata is a species of plant in the genus Brocchinia. This species is native to Venezuela and Colombia.

References

acuminata
Flora of Venezuela
Flora of Colombia
Plants described in 1939